Abraham Jennison (11 April 1804 – ?) was a convict transported to Western Australia.  His significance is mainly that one of his letters home to family in England is extant.

Biography
Nothing is known of Abraham Jennison's early life, but in July 1848 he was 44 years old, married with ten children, and working as a blacksmith. In that month, he and two companions were convicted of stealing items including a gun and a pig, and Jennison was sentenced to seven years' transportation.  He arrived in Western Australia on board the Pyrenees in June 1851, and was immediately issued with a ticket of leave.  He received a conditional pardon in December 1854.  Thereafter, he worked for a number of years at Tibradden, John Sydney Davis' Champion Bay station.

In November 1861, Jennison received letters from his children telling him that his wife Hannah had died, and enquiring about joining him in Australia.  Jennison's reply, in which he stated that "A person can do very well if he is a mind to work", was kept by his family for generations, and is extant today.  Jennison's family did not emigrate to Australia and this letter is apparently the last letter that he wrote to his children.  Nothing is known of Jennison's later life.

References

Sources

 

1804 births
Convicts transported to Western Australia
Year of death missing